Cartilage oligomeric matrix protein (COMP), also known as thrombospondin-5, is an extracellular matrix (ECM) protein primarily present in cartilage. In humans it is encoded by the COMP gene.

Function 

The protein encoded by this gene is a noncollagenous extracellular matrix (ECM) protein. It consists of five identical glycoprotein subunits, each with EGF-like and calcium-binding (thrombospondin-like) domains. Oligomerization results from formation of a five-stranded coiled coil and disulfide bonds. Binding to other ECM proteins such as collagen appears to depend on divalent cations. Mutations can cause the osteochondrodysplasias pseudoachondroplasia (PSACH) and multiple epiphyseal dysplasia (MED).

COMP is a marker of cartilage turnover. It is present in high quantities in fibrotic scars and systemic sclerosis, and it appears to have a role in vascular wall remodeling.

References

Further reading

External links 
  GeneReviews/NCBI/NIH/UW entry on Pseudoachondroplasia
  GeneReviews/NCBI/NIH/UW entry on Multiple Epiphyseal Dysplasia, Dominant
 

Extracellular matrix proteins
Thrombospondins